Project Destination is a 2020 Philippine television drama series broadcast by GMA News TV. Directed by Zig Dulay, it stars Migo Adecer, Kate Valdez and Royce Cabrera. It premiered on GMA News TV on March 14, 2020. The series concluded on April 18, 2020 with a total of 6 episodes.

Cast and characters
 Migo Adecer as Andre
 Kate Valdez as Loret
 Royce Cabrera as Jay
 Yul Servo as Jojo
 Angeli Bayani as Isabel

Production
Project Destination is a production of GMA News and Public Affairs, made under the commission of the National Commission for Culture and the Arts. The series was directed by Zig Dulay. Conceptualized a drama series as a platform to promote "Filipino values" remarking that the government cultural agency could not just conduct lectures about values traditionally believing that such methods would not be receptive to the youth.

The NCAA conducted two years of research as part of Project Destination'''s production conducting focus group discussion with various groups including indigenous groups, the academe, and the business sector and inquired them of what do they value "as a Filipino". The discussions were held using various dialects and languages.

The NCAA were able to identify 160 values and trimmed down their list to just 19 by dropping values that have the same meaning or is similar to another. According to the agency the most common values they identify relate to "love for family" and "giving importance to education".

Music
The theme song of Project Destination, "Dati'y Pangarap Lang Kita" was performed by Aiza Seguerra. and composed by NCCA Public Affairs and Information head Rene Napeñas.

BroadcastProject Destination'' aired every Saturday late afternoon on GMA News TV for six weeks, starting on March 14, 2020.

References

2020 Philippine television series debuts
2020 Philippine television series endings
GMA Integrated News and Public Affairs shows
GMA News TV original programming
Philippine drama television series